Goharshad Mosque is a grand congregational mosque built during the Timurid period in Mashhad, Razavi Khorasan Province, Iran, which now serves as one of the prayer halls within the Imam Reza shrine complex.

History
It was built by the order of Empress Goharshad, the wife of Shah Rukh of the Timurid dynasty in 1418 CE. The architect of the edifice was Ghavameddin Shirazi, who is responsible for so many of Shah Rukh's great buildings, with the architectural and decorative manpower supplied from Shiraz and Isfahan.

The mosque underwent some renovations during the Safavid and Qajar eras. Various inscriptions found on mosaic tile work inside the mosque and its courtyard mention the names of Safavid shahs such as Shah Abbas, Shah Soltan Hussayn, Shah Soleyman Safavid and describe their devotion to the Shrine and the contributions they made to the mosque.

The double-layered dome of the mosque was severely damaged in 1911 in bombings by troops of the Russian Empire. In the 1960s, over 5 centuries after its initial construction, the dome of Goharshad mosque was deemed to be in severe structural danger, damages caused by various earthquakes over time, the 1911 Russian bombings, and the attack on the mosque by Reza Shah during the 1935 rebellion required the dome to be rebuilt. Under the imperial orders of Mohammad Reza Pahlavi, the tiles from the ancient dome were removed in the 1960s and the external shell was dismantled. In order to address the structural dangers, a new external shell was built with an iron frame and cement covering. The dome was then re-tiled, in a similar fashion to the original. While such repairs were necessary, they permanently altered the historic identity of the mosque.

In the 1960s, the mosque's eastern iwan also received restoration work. It was pulled down to the foundations and rebuilt from concrete in the same aesthetic style as the original.

Following the event of the 1979 Islamic Revolution, expansions were planned for the entirety of the Shrine complex, a new courtyard named "Sahn-e-Qods" was added on to the back side of Gowharshad mosque, where the historic bazaar once had led up to.

Design

See also
Greater Khorasan
Ali ar-Ridha
List of mosques
Goharshad Mosque rebellion

References

External links

Archnet's entry on Goharshad Mosque

Buildings and structures completed in 1418
15th-century mosques
Mosques in Iran
Timurid dynasty
Buildings and structures in Mashhad
Tourist attractions in Razavi Khorasan Province
Imam Reza shrine